The 2009 FIFA U-17 World Cup was the thirteenth tournament of the FIFA U-17 World Cup held in Nigeria from 24 October to 15 November 2009.

The tournament was won by Switzerland, beating the host team and holders, Nigeria. The Golden Ball to the Best Player was given to Nigerian Sani Emmanuel; the Golden Shoe for top scorer was given to Spaniard Borja, with five goals (although he tied with Nigerian Sani Emmanuel, Uruguayan Sebastián Gallegos, and Swiss Haris Seferovic); the Golden Glove was given to Swiss Benjamin Siegrist; finally, the FIFA Fair Play Award was given to Nigeria.

Player eligibility 
To be eligible to play, a player must have been born on or after 1 January 1992.

Venues 
FIFA chose eight venues out of nine possible locations.

On 21 May 2009, FIFA gave Nigeria a "Yellow Card" as FIFA noted a significant delay in the preparations for the tournament. While Abuja and Lagos were ready, FIFA vice-president Jack Warner gave four other venues (Enugu, Calabar, Ijebu-Ode and Kano) a month to get 100 percent ready or the tournament would be moved. One potential venue (Warri) was removed after recent violence flared up in the Niger Delta.

Threats to the tournament 

The 2009 edition was under increasing threats from the armed rebel group, The Movement for the Emancipation of the Niger Delta (MEND) and warned FIFA against hosting the tournament in Nigeria. However, the militants were offered amnesty in exchange for laying down their weapons, and the tournament went on smoothly without any incidents.

Teams 
The final draw for group stage was held on 7 August 2009 at the International Conference Centre in Abuja.

1.Teams that made their debut.

Match officials

Squads

Allocation of teams to groups 
Teams were allocated to groups on the basis of geographical spread. Teams were placed in four pots, and one team was drawn from each pot for each group. Pot 1 contained the five African teams plus one from CONMEBOL; Pot 2 contained the remaining teams from the Americas excluding one CONCACAF team; Pot 3 consisted of teams from Asia and Oceania plus the remaining CONCACAF team; Pot 4 consisted of teams from the European confederation.

Group stage
All times are West Africa Time (UTC+1)

Group A

Group B

Group C

Group D

Group E

Group F

Ranking of third-placed teams

Knockout stage 
All times are West Africa Time (UTC+1)

Round of 16

Quarter-finals

Semi-finals

Third place match

Final

Awards

Goalscorers 
5 goals

  Sani Emmanuel
  Borja
  Haris Seferovic
  Sebastián Gallegos

4 goals
  Nassim Ben Khalifa

3 goals

  Sergio Araujo
  Mario Götze
  Lennart Thy
  Son Heung-min
  Edafe Egbedi
  Stanley Okoro
  Adrià Carmona
  Isco
  Sergi Roberto
  Ricardo Rodríguez
  Muhammet Demir

2 goals

  Abdoulaye Ibrango
  Gustavo Cuéllar
  Ebrima Bojang
  Federico Carraro
  Pietro Iemmello
  Takumi Miyayoshi
  Lee Jong-ho
  Abdul Jeleel Ajagun
  Álvaro Morata
  Engin Bekdemir
  Mohammed Sebil
  Jack McInerney
  Adrián Luna

1 goal

  Esteban Espíndola
  Leandro González Pírez
  Esteban Orfano
  Guilherme
  Neymar
  Wellington Nem
  Victor Nikiema
  Louckmane Ouédraogo
  Bertrand Traoré
  Zidane Zoungrana
  Jean Carlos Blanco
  Fabián Castillo
  Deiner Córdoba
  Jeison Murillo
  Héctor Quiñones
  Jorge Luis Ramos
  Joel Campbell
  Juan Bustos Golobio
  Jonathan Moya
  Lamin Sarjo Samateh
  Yunus Mallı
  Shkodran Mustafi
  Florian Trinks
  Kevin Volland
  Anthony Lozano
  Afshin Esmaeilzadeh
  Milad Gharibi
  Kaveh Rezaei
  Payam Sadeghian
  Giacomo Beretta
  Michele Camporese
  Shuto Kojima
  Kenyu Sugimoto
  Yoshiaki Takagi
  Kim Dong-jin
  Kim Jin-su
  Nam Seung-woo
  Luke Milanzi
  Miguel Basulto
  Carlos Campos
  Guillermo Madrigal
  Carlos Parra
  Tom Boere
  Luc Castaignos
  Oğuzhan Özyakup
  Michael Built
  Jack Hobson-McVeigh
  Gordon Murie
  Ramón Azeez
  Terry Envoh
  Omoh Ojabu
  Kenneth Omeruo
  Javier Espinosa
  Pablo Sarabia
  Oliver Buff
  André Gonçalves
  Pajtim Kasami
  Bruno Martignoni
  Granit Xhaka
  Gökay Iravul
  Ufuk Özbek
  Ömer Ali Şahiner
  Furkan Şeker
  Marwan Al-Saffar
  Nick Palodichuk
  Alex Shinsky
  Nicolás Mezquida

1 own goal
  José Rodríguez (against Switzerland)

Final ranking

See also 
 FIFA U-17 World Cup
 2009 FIFA U-20 World Cup

References

External links 
 FIFA U-17 World Cup Nigeria 2009, FIFA.com
 FIFA Technical Report

World
2009 in youth association football
2009
2009
October 2009 sports events in Africa
November 2009 sports events in Africa